The Bishop of Warwick is an episcopal title used by a suffragan bishop of the Church of England Diocese of Coventry, in the Province of Canterbury, England. The title takes its name after Warwick, the county town of Warwickshire; the See was erected under the Suffragans Nomination Act 1888 by Order in Council dated 19 December 1979.

List of bishops

References

External links
 Crockford's Clerical Directory - Listings

 
Warwick
Diocese of Coventry